The title of Quetelet professor is a distinction awarded to professors at Columbia University. It is named after Adolphe Quetelet, the Belgian astronomer, mathematician, statistician, sociologist, and founder of the Royal Observatory of Belgium.

Recipients 
The prize is currently held by:
Paul Lazarsfeld, Q.p. of Social Science (1963, emeritus 1971)
Peter Blau, Q.p. of sociology (1977, emeritus 1988)
Jonathan Cole, Q.p. of Social Science (1989)
Jeffrey Sachs, Q.p. of sustainable development (2002)
Mario Luis Small, Q.p. of Social Science (2022)

Columbia University
Academic awards
Professorships
Educational institutions in the United States with year of establishment missing